Acrobiston is a genus of moths in the family Geometridae.

Species
 Acrobiston aestivalis Wiltshire, 1967

References
 Acrobiston at Markku Savela's Lepidoptera and some other life forms

Ennominae
Geometridae genera